Harpochilus is a genus of flowering plants belonging to the family Acanthaceae.

Its native range is Brazil.

Species:

Harpochilus neesianus 
Harpochilus paraibanus

References

Acanthaceae
Acanthaceae genera